Hurricane Frank was a Category 1 hurricane that caused minor damage in Mexico in late August 2010. The ninth tropical cyclone, sixth named storm, and third (and final) hurricane of the inactive 2010 Pacific hurricane season, Frank formed from an area of thunderstorms from the Caribbean Sea, and became Tropical Depression Nine-E on August 21 while located just south of the Mexican Coast. It moved northwest, and became Tropical Storm Frank only 12 hours after it was declared a depression. It strengthened to its initial peak as a moderate tropical storm, and weakened due to increasing wind shear late on the August 23. It later recovered, and became a hurricane on August 25. After peaking as a strong Category 1 hurricane, it rapidly weakened, and dissipated on August 28. Although Frank never made landfall, it did impact western Mexico. A total of six people were killed with over 800,000 people affected.

Meteorological history

Frank origins were from a from a difficult to track tropical wave that moved off the west coast of Africa. A large area of thunderstorms formed near the Windward Islands. Atmosphere convection fluctuated as its associated tropical wave moved across the Caribbean Sea and a mid-level circulation developed. The system was in a favorable environment, thus gradual development was anticipated. On August 21, the atmospheric convection had become better organized, and it develop curved rainbands. On 1800 UTC August 21, advisories were initiated on Tropical Depression Nine-E while located roughly 205 mi (330 km) southeast of Salina Cruz, Mexico.

Upon becoming a tropical cyclone, the storm was located in a favorable environment with sea surface temperatures near  and fairly weak wind shear. As such, the National Hurricane Center (NHC) anticipated the storm to reach minimal hurricane intensity. Due to weak steering currents, the depression drifted westbound. Initially there was no change in organization, but on August 22, the cloud patterns improved. Based on estimates from the Tropical Analysis and Forecast Branch (TAFB), the depression was upgraded into Tropical Storm Frank on 1200 UTC August 22. Although deep convection had weakened, the NHC re-assessed the intensity at 60 mph (95 km/h) later that day. However, high levels of northeasterly wind shear caused the system to weaken slightly the next day, and by early August 24, the NHC was no longer forecasting the storm to become a hurricane. Despite the shear, there was a burst of deep convection later that day and a gradual increase in organization. Microwave imagery at 0834 and 1714 UTC showed a closed ring of thunderstorm activity that resembled an eye and by early August 25, the cyclone was just below hurricane intensity.

During the next six hours, Frank became much better organized with a large area of very deep convection near the center. Based on this, the NHC upgraded the system into a hurricane. Gradually intensifying, an eye became intermediately visible on infrared imagery and a persistent eye was visible via microwave imagery. While at peak intensity, satellite imagery showed a small but distinct eye surrounded by a central dense overcast, or a large area of thunderstorm activity. Moving west-northwest, Frank began a weakening trend overnight as the eye became less defined. Continuing to weaken, Frank became less organized and its eye collapsed. On August 27, the NHC downgraded Frank into a tropical storm, with poorly organized convection located west of the center due to strong wind shear. As such, the agency predicted the storm to weaken into a tropical depression within the next 36 hours. Frank rapidly lost all thunderstorm activity because of cooler water, and the storms intensity was reduced to a swirl of clouds while it turned towards the north due to a mid-level trough. The cyclone weakened back into a tropical depression early on August 28. The remnant low dissipated early on August 29.

Preparations, impact, and aftermath

Although Frank never made landfall, it did come very close to the Mexican Riviera, and upon development, a tropical storm watch was issued for parts of the Mexican coast by the local government. On 1800 UTC August 22, a tropical storm warning was issued. These watches and warnings were dropped on August 24 as the system moved away from the coast. These rains had the potential to produce life-threatening flash floods and mudslides. Officials gave Frank a hazard rating of intense for the Mexican Pacific, and strong for Baja California Sur. In Guerrero, Michoacán, and Jalisco, alerts were issued due to the threat of torrential rainfall. Forecasters also noted the possibility of the storm affecting Sinaloa, with high waves being the main threat.

The storm also produced gusty conditions along the Mexican coast. In addition, a total of six deaths were reported. A total 30 homes were destroyed with 26 others damaged due to flooding. Two major roads were damaged with another road blocked due to a landslides. Several rivers overflowed their banks, thus causing 171 rural communities to be flooded in seven municipalities. In the state of Tabasco over 800,000 people were affected. The city of Villahermosa received the worst flood since 2007, and a total of 8,500 people were victims of the storm. To prevent the situation from getting worse, residents piled up sandbags. In Oaxaca, four people were killed. A mudslide in the municipality of Totontepec Villa de Morelos caused two farmers to die. Another mudslide in Oaxaca caused six vehicles to drive off Federal Highway 182, causing two more deaths. A total of 60,000 people were homeless. Many communities were isolated as several bridges and roads were destroyed due to the heavy rainfall.

In the aftermath of the storm, the Mexican Army provided aid for the people affected. A total of 110 communities requested assistance from the government. By September 14, an estimated 200,000 food packages were distributed to the region. Damage repairs from Hurricane Frank totaled to 100 million pesos ($8.3 million USD).

See also

Other storms of the same name

References

Frank
Frank (2010)
Frank (2010)
Frank